Marin Anastasovici Stadium is a soccer-specific stadium in Giurgiu, Romania. It is built on the site of the former stadium. The venue was opened in 2014 and formerly served as the home for Astra Giurgiu until they folded in 2022. It has a seat capacity of 8,500. 

The first game for Romania at Giurgiu was a friendly match against Lithuania on 23 March 2016.

The stadium also hosted various UEFA Europa League matches but also a match from the UEFA Champions League qualifying rounds.

Events

Association football

International club football

External links
 Stadium images

See also

List of football stadiums in Romania

References

Football venues in Romania
Sport in Giurgiu
Buildings and structures in Giurgiu County
FC Astra Giurgiu